Country was the first book published by Rolling Stone magazine critic Nick Tosches. Released in 1977 under the title Country: The Biggest Music in America, it was retitled in later editions as Country: Living Legends and Dying Metaphors in America's Biggest Music and Country: The Twisted Roots of Rock and Roll.

Rather than a detailed, chronological study of country music, the book is arranged like a fan's scrapbook, leaping across time and subject. Throughout Country, Tosches makes a point of paying tribute to pivotal but undersung figures in country, hillbilly, and blues music, including Emmett Miller, Cliff Carlisle, and Val and Pete. He also pays tribute to early music writers, such as Emma Bell Miles, whose 1904 essay Some Real American Music Tosches called "the most beautiful prose written of country music."

References

1977 books
Music books
Books by Nick Tosches